Richard Sallaba (23 November 1905 – 2 May 1956) was an Austrian stage actor and operatic as well as operetta tenor.

Life 
From 1927 to 1931, he worked as an actor at the Wiener Volkstheater, then he decided to become a singer. He travelled with an operetta group through the Netherlands, Belgium and West Germany. In 1933–1934, he worked in Solothurn and from 1934 until 1935 in Bern. He was then a member of the Vienna State Opera from 1936 to 1945, and in 1946 at the Volksoper Wien.

Sallaba died in Vienna aged 50. His last resting place is at the Döbling Cemetery in Vienna.

References

External links 
 
 

Austrian operatic tenors
Austrian stage actors
1905 births
1956 deaths
Male actors from Vienna
Musicians from Vienna
Burials in Vienna
20th-century Austrian male opera singers